Human Target is an American action drama television series broadcast by ABC in the United States. It is based on the DC comic book character of the same title created by Len Wein and Carmine Infantino, and developed for television by Danny Bilson and Paul DeMeo. The seven-episode series premiered on July 20, 1992, and last aired on August 29 the same year. The more recent 2010 Fox television series of the same name, is also based on the Human Target character.

Synopsis 
The series follows the adventures of Christopher Chance (Rick Springfield), a Vietnam War vet turned bodyguard and private investigator who uses advanced technology and sophisticated makeup to assume the identity of his client, becoming a human target.  In a departure from the original comic book stories, Chance flies from job to job in a large, gizmo-laden stealth aircraft known as the Blackwing. Additionally, he is assisted by computer expert Philo Marsden (Kirk Baltz), Blackwing pilot Jeff Carlyle (Sami Chester), and former CIA operative Libby Page (Signy Coleman).  Page coordinated Chance's missions, Carlyle also served as cook and chauffeur, while Marsden created new gadgets and developed the masks Chance used to impersonate his clients. Chance took an unusual approach to compensation for his services: ten percent of his client's annual income ("whether you're a busboy or the king of England"). One reviewer described the show as "50 percent Mission: Impossible (Martin Landau's master of disguise character) and 50 percent Quantum Leap (jumping into other people's lives at moments of crisis)".

Cast 
 Rick Springfield as Christopher Chance
 Kirk Baltz as Philo Marsden
 Sami Chester as Jeff Carlyle
 Signy Coleman as Libby Page

Production 
The show was created by Warner Bros. Television and Pet Fly Productions, producers of The Flash and later  The Sentinel for Paramount Pictures. The original pilot for the series was filmed in 1990 but ABC declined to pick up the series for the 1990-91 television season and this pilot never aired.  In the original unaired pilot, musician Clarence Clemons who was trying to establish himself as an actor, played Chance's pilot and Frances Fisher as Libby Page.

Harvey Shephard, then the president of Warner Bros. Television, told The New York Times in December 1991 that Human Target was intended for both American audiences and the international television market.

The show was finally picked up in October 1991 by ABC as a seven-episode midseason replacement series, eventually airing in July and August 1992 to low ratings and poor critical reception. The debut episode aired on Monday, July 20, before moving to its regular Saturday night time slot for the following six episodes. The seventh and final episode aired on Saturday, August 29.

Episodes

Tie-ins 

In November 1991, DC Comics produced a 48-page one-shot titled The Human Target Special #1, marketed as a tie-in to the then-upcoming television show (the comic's cover advertised that it was "Coming soon to ABC-TV!"). The comic has Chance and his team protecting a DEA agent from assassination. It was written by Mark Verheiden, with pencils by Rick Burchett and inks by Dick Giordano.

Reception 
Ken Tucker of Entertainment Weekly graded the series a "C−", describing the plot of the aired pilot episode as "paper-thin" and that the series as a whole "seems campy in a dumb way, with stilted dialogue and stiff action scenes". Writing in the Chicago Tribune, Rick Kogan called the series "one of the goofiest action-adventure shows you'll ever see". Terry Kelleher's review in Newsday complained that "the strangest aspect is that the actor playing [Chance]'s client [...] winds up grabbing more screen time than [series star Rick] Springfield". Syndicated columnist Jon Burlingame of United Features credited the show with "some interesting effects" but called the drama itself "pretty tired", lamenting that "the outrageously appropriate comic-book style of The Flash" was "completely absent". Lon Grahnke of the Chicago Sun-Times found "part-time pop singer and [...] matinee idol" Springfield "hard to believe in the title role" as a retired Special Forces commando. In real life, Springfield did spend time in Vietnam during the war, but as part of an Australian band entertaining American troops in 1969.

References

External links 

1990s American drama television series
1992 American television series debuts
1992 American television series endings
American Broadcasting Company original programming
English-language television shows
Television shows based on DC Comics
Television series by Warner Bros. Television Studios
Espionage television series
Television shows set in Seattle
American action television series
Human Target